Pulborough is an electoral division of West Sussex in the United Kingdom and returns one member to sit on West Sussex County Council. The current County Councillor, Pat Arculus, is also Cabinet Member for Children and Young People's Services.

Extent
The division covers the villages of Coldwaltham, Hardham, Nutbourne, Pulborough, Thakeham, West Chiltington and West Chiltington Common.

It comprises the following Horsham District wards: Chanctonbury Ward and Pulborough & Coldwaltham Ward; and of the following civil parishes: Coldwaltham, Pulborough, Thakeham and West Chiltington.

Election results

2013 Election
Results of the election held on 2 May 2013:

2009 Election
Results of the election held on 4 June 2009:

2005 Election
Results of the election held on 5 May 2005:

References
Election Results - West Sussex County Council

External links
 West Sussex County Council
 Election Maps

Electoral Divisions of West Sussex